5Beta-Scymnol, also known simply as scymnol, is a synthetic INCI-listed skin conditioning ingredient. The molecule is a steroid derivative that behaves as a hydroxyl radical scavenger and is used for the treatment of skin blemishes such as blocked pores and acne.

History

The molecule was identified and isolated from shark tissues by Professor Takuo Kosuge, Shizuoka College of Pharmacy, Shizuoka, Japan during the 1980s. Based on usage as a traditional folk remedy, it was hypothesised the ingredient may be effective for the treatment of scalds, blemishes and acne.

Traits
5Beta-Scymnol is a hydroxyl (OH) free radical scavenger.  Scymnol's role in quenching free radicals may play a role in inhibiting acne.

References 

Steroids
Polyols